Rikke Petersen-Schmidt (born 14 January 1975) is a former Danish team handball player and two times Olympic champion. She received a gold medal with the Danish national team both at the 2000 Summer Olympics in Sydney, and at the 2004 Summer Olympics in Athens.

References

1975 births
Living people
Danish female handball players
Olympic gold medalists for Denmark
Handball players at the 2000 Summer Olympics
Handball players at the 2004 Summer Olympics
Olympic medalists in handball
Medalists at the 2004 Summer Olympics
Sportspeople from Aarhus
Medalists at the 2000 Summer Olympics